The Secretary for Communications, Tourism and Culture was bureau secretary in the Portuguese administration in Macau. The Secretary was responsible for communications and promoting the colony of Macau. The department's sections were merged into the Secretariat for Social Affairs and Culture (Macau). Before the transfer of Communications to the Secretariat it was called Secretariat for Tourism and Culture.

The responsibilities for communications was transferred from the old Secretary for Public Works and Communications.

Organisational structure 
 Cultural Affairs Bureau
 Macau Government Tourist Office
 Macau Sports Development Board
 Institute of Tourism Studies
 Macau Grand Prix Committee
 Macau Tourism Office in Portugal

List of Secretariats

 Dr. Antonio Salavessa da Costa 1998-1999
 Salavessa de Costa - under-secretary

References
 Casa de Macau - references to former Portuguese secretaries

Government departments and agencies of Macau
Members of the Executive Council of Macau
Political office-holders in Macau
Positions of the Macau Government